Electoral district VIII (Croatian: VIII. izborna jedinica) is one of twelve electoral districts of Croatian Parliament.

Boundaries  
Electoral district VIII consist of:

 whole Istria County;
 western part of Primorje-Gorski Kotar County including cities and municipalities: Baška, Cres, Crikvenica, Dobrinj, Kostrena, Kraljevica, Krk, Lovran, Mali Lošinj, Malinska - Dubašnica, Matulji, Mošćenička Draga, Omišalj, Opatija, Punat, Rab, Rijeka, Vrbnik.

Election

2000 Elections 
 

SDP - HSLS - PGS
 Slavko Linić
 Nikola Ivaniš
 Željko Glavan
 Drago Kraljević
 Jadranka Katarinčić-Škrlj
 Vladimir Šepčić
 Luciano Sušanj

IDS - HSS - LS - HNS - ASH
 Ivan Jakovčić
 Damir Kajin
 Valter Drandić
 Ante Simonić
 Petar Turčinović

HDZ
 Zlatko Mateša
 Nevio Šetić

2003 Elections 
 

SDP - IDS 
 Damir Kajin
 Gordana Sobol
 Valter Drandić
 Biserka Perman
 Ivan Jakovčić
 Anton Peruško
 Dorotea Pešić-Bukovac
 Zdenko Antešić

HDZ
 Lino Červar
 Vladimir Vranković
 Nevio Šetić

HNS - PGS
 Miljenko Dorić
 Nikola Ivaniš

HSU
 Silvano Hrelja

2007 Elections 
 

SDP
 Zlatko Komadina
 Slavko Linić
 Dino Kozlevac
 Gordana Sobol
 Željko Jovanović
 Luka Denona
 Tanja Vrbat

HDZ
 Lino Červar
 Gari Cappelli
 Bojan Hlača

IDS 
 Damir Kajin
 Ivan Jakovčić
 Boris Miletić

HSU
 Silvano Hrelja

2011 Elections 
 

SDP - HNS - IDS - HSU
 Zlatko Komadina
 Damir Kajin
 Željko Jovanović
 Silvano Hrelja
 Romana Jerković
 Ivan Jakovčić
 Tanja Vrbat
 Nada Turina-Đurić
 Peđa Grbin
 Valter Boljunčić
 Ana Komparić Devčić

HDZ
 Davor Božinović
 Josip Borić

HL SR
 Nansi Tireli

2015 Elections 
 

SDP - HNS - HSU - HL SR - A-HSS - ZS
 Zlatko Komadina
 Peđa Grbin
 Silvano Hrelja
 Nansi Tireli
 Ana Komparić Devčić
 Tanja Vrbat Grgić
 Dino Manestar

IDS - PGS - RI
 Boris Miletić
 Giovanni Sponza
 Tulio Demetlika

HDZ - HSS - HSP AS - BUZ - HSLS - HRAST - HDS - ZDS
 Oleg Butković
 Ivan Kirin
 Anton Kliman

Most
 Ines Strenja-Linić

2016 Elections 
 

SDP - HNS - HSS - HSU
 Željko Jovanović
 Peđa Grbin
 Silvano Hrelja
 Nada Turina-Đurić
 Romana Jerković
 Ana Komparić Devčić

IDS - PGS - RI
 Boris Miletić
 Giovanni Sponza
 Tulio Demetlika

HDZ
 Oleg Butković
 Ivan Kirin
 Anton Kliman

ŽZ - PH - AM
 Marin Škibola

Most
 Ines Strenja-Linić

2020 Elections 
 

SDP - HSS - HSU - SNAGA - GLAS - IDS - PGS
 Peđa Grbin
 Erik Fabijanić
 Tulio Demetlika
 Silvano Hrelja
 Katarina Nemet
 Mirela Ahmetović
 Marin Lerotić
 Sanja Radolović

HDZ
 Oleg Butković
 Anton Kliman
 Gari Cappelli
 Ivan Kirin

Možemo - NL - RF - ORAH - ZJN - ZG
 Katarina Peović

Most
 Marin Miletić

References 

Electoral districts in Croatia